João Carlos Almeida Leandro (born 13 September 1995), known as Joca, is a Portuguese footballer who plays for Florgrade Futebol Clube as a central defender.

Club career
Born in  Lourosa (Santa Maria da Feira), Joca spent his formative years with local club C.D. Feirense. His only competitive game with the first team occurred on 13 August 2014, when he played 90 minutes against C.D. Aves for that season's Taça da Liga (1–1 home draw).

References

External links

1995 births
Living people
Sportspeople from Santa Maria da Feira
Portuguese footballers
Association football defenders
Segunda Divisão players
C.D. Feirense players
S.C. Espinho players
Lusitânia F.C. players